Resolution is an album by American jazz saxophonist Hamiet Bluiett recorded in 1977 for the Italian Black Saint label.

Reception
The Allmusic review awarded the album 3 stars.

Track listing
All compositions by Hamiet Bluiett except as indicated
 "Happy Spirit" - 14:35 
 "Flux/A Bad M.F." - 6:32 
 "Head Drake" - 7:50 
 "Before Yesterday" (Bluiett, Fred Hopkins, Billy Hart, Don Moye) - 5:16 
 "Spring's Joy" - 4:47 
 "Mahalia...No Other One" (Bluiett, Don Pullen) - 1:58
Recorded at Generation Sound Studios in New York City in November 1977

Personnel
Hamiet Bluiett - baritone saxophone, clarinet, flute, bamboo flute
Don Pullen - piano, organ
Fred Hopkins - bass
Billy Hart - drums, percussion
Don Moye - Sun percussion

References

Black Saint/Soul Note albums
Hamiet Bluiett albums
1977 albums